The 2011 Texas A&M Aggies women's soccer team represented Texas A&M University in the 2011 NCAA Division I women's college soccer season. The Aggies were led by G. Guerrieri, who has coached the team since the program's inception in 1993 (19 years).

The 2011 team had 25 roster players, with 14 scholarships to utilize between them.

2011 schedule

Lineup/Formation
4–3–3 shown
Mouseover names for stats

Roster/statistics
Starters highlighted in green

Season review

Non-Conference
Texas A&M opened its season with a pair of games against 2010 NCAA tournament teams Fresno State and UC Irvine.  Despite the debut of 10 freshmen, which was considered one of the nation's best recruiting classes, the Aggies outshot and outscored the Bulldogs 4–2.  All four goals were scored by freshmen, two by Allie Bailey and one each by Shea Groom and Leigh Edwards.  Against #17 UC Irvine, despite outshooting the Anteaters 21–5 and holding possession for almost the entire match, A&M fell 1–0 in a disappointing loss.  The Aggies missed scoring opportunities on 3 separate 1v1 against the UC Irvine GK, and also hit the crossbar on a header by freshman Meghan Streight off a corner kick in the 2nd half.  Both games were notable in that the weather conditions were very hot, with temperatures hovering over 100 degrees during the matches.

The Aggies first foray on the road was not a good one.  Playing in a tournament in Knoxville, A&M lost matches to Florida, 2–3, and Tennessee, 0–1, despite garnering the majority of possession and shots on goal in both matches.  Against the Gators, after an even first half in which Annie Kunz and Kelley Monogue scored to tie the match at 2-2, the second half belonged to the Aggies, outshooting Florida 13-5 (21-12 overall).  The Gators cleared four shots by A&M off their own goal line and thwarted several other good scoring chances.  However, in the final minutes Florida regained momentum and scored the winning goal with 15 seconds left in regulation.  Against Tennessee, A&M again gained the majority of possession and outshot the Vols 16–8, but couldn't find a goal against the stingy Tennessee defense.  The Aggies hit the post four times in the match, including twice by Kelley Monogue in a frantic 33rd minute in which the Vol defense was under intense pressure.  A&M also missed a couple of 1v1 with the Vol GK, the closest being Bianca Brinson's missed shot just wide of the goal in the 36th minute.  Tennessee was awarded a PK in the 35th minute after A&M GK Jordan Day became entangled with a Vol forward, resulting in the 1–0 win for Tennessee.  It was only the 3rd time in A&M history that the Aggies had lost 3 consecutive games, and it was the first time an Aggies squad had started the season 1–3.

Conference

NCAA tournament

Accolades/notes

References

External links

Official website

Texas A&M Aggies women's soccer seasons
Texas AandM